Gary Wolf may refer to:

 Gary K. Wolf (born 1941), American author and humorist
 Gary Wolf (journalist), writer and contributing editor at Wired magazine
 Gary K. Wolfe (born 1946), American editor and critic

See also
Gary Wolfe (disambiguation)